Børge Johannes Lauritsen (22 October 1916 – 23 June 1944) was a merchant and member of the Danish resistance executed by the German occupying power.

Biography 
Lauritsen was born in Års on 22 October 1916 to merchant Poul Lauritsen and wife Rasmine Nielsen and baptized at home in Års 14 November the same year.

In 1930 Lauritsen was confirmed in Års church on the 16th Sunday after Trinity.

On 23 June 1944 Lauritsen and seven other members of the resistance were executed in Ryvangen and buried there the same day.

After his death 
The January 1945 issue of the resistance newspaper Frit Danmark (Free Denmark) reported on the execution of the eight resistance members including Lauritsen.

On 22 June 1945 the remains of Lauritsen were found in Ryvangen and the same day an inquest in the Department of Forensic Medicine of the university of Copenhagen showed that he died from three gunshot wounds in the chest. The remains of at least six of the others executed with him were likewise exhumed in Ryvangen and transferred to the Department of Forensic Medicine.

On 26 June 1945 Lauritsen as well as Jørgen Rydder, who was executed with him and like him born in Års, were buried in their home town.

A memorial stone for Lauritsen and 90 other resistance members also exhumed in Ryvangen and buried in their respective home towns was laid down in Ryvangen Memorial Park.

References 

1916 births
1944 deaths
Danish people executed by Nazi Germany
Danish people of World War II
Danish resistance members
Resistance members killed by Nazi Germany
People from Vesthimmerland Municipality